In model theory, a branch of mathematical logic, the Hrushovski construction generalizes the Fraïssé limit by working with a notion of strong substructure  rather than . It can be thought of as a kind of "model-theoretic forcing", where a (usually) stable structure is created, called the generic or rich  model. The specifics of  determine various properties of the generic, with its geometric properties being of particular interest. It was initially used by Ehud Hrushovski to generate a stable structure with an "exotic" geometry, thereby refuting Zil'ber's Conjecture.

Three conjectures 
The initial applications of the Hrushovski construction refuted two conjectures and answered a third question in the negative. Specifically, we have:

 Lachlan's Conjecture. Any stable -categorical theory is totally transcendental.

 Zil'ber's Conjecture. Any uncountably categorical theory is either locally modular or interprets an algebraically closed field.

 Cherlin's Question. Is there a maximal (with respect to expansions) strongly minimal set?

The construction 

Let L be a finite relational language. Fix C a class of finite L-structures which are closed under isomorphisms and
substructures. We want to strengthen the notion of substructure; let  be a relation on pairs from C satisfying:

  implies 
  and  implies 
  for all  
  implies  for all  

Definition. An embedding  is strong if 

Definition. The pair  has the amalgamation property if  then there is a  so that each  embeds strongly into  with the same image for 

Definition. For infinite  and  we say  iff  for  

Definition.

Definition. A countable structure  is -generic if:

 For 

 For  if  then there is a strong embedding of  into  over 

  has finite closures: for every  is finite.

Theorem. If  has the amalgamation property, then there is a unique -generic.

The existence proof proceeds in imitation of the existence proof for Fraïssé limits. The uniqueness proof comes from an easy back and forth argument.

References 

Model theory